Streets of Rage is a 1994 American action crime film directed by Richard Elfman (credited as Aristide Sumatra) and co-written by Elfman and Mimi Lesseos, based on a story by Lesseos. The film stars Lesseos and Oliver Page.

Premise
A Los Angeles reporter who is a former Special Forces commando investigates a child prostitution ring.

Cast
 Mimi Lesseos as Melody Sails
 Oliver Page as Lunar
 Christopher Cass as Ryan McCain
 Ira Gold as Steven
 Juli James as Candy
 Gokor Chivichyan as Gokor
 James Michael White as Nick
 Tony Gibson as Harrison
 Lee Wessof as Max
 Shenin Siapinski as Flash
 Thyra Metz as Billie
 Darline Harris as Josie
 Carl Irwin as Butler

Reception
Entertainment Weekly gave the film a "C" grade, stating that Oliver Page's portrayal of the antagonist was "pure textbook" but crediting Lesseos as "the sexiest head-butter in B movies".

References

External links

1994 films
1990s crime action films
American crime action films
Films set in Los Angeles
1990s English-language films
1990s American films